Elektrėnai is a city of about 11,000 inhabitants in Lithuania; since 2000 it has been the capital of the Elektrėnai Municipality. It is situated between the two largest cities in Lithuania – Vilnius and Kaunas.

History
Historically, couple of villages were located in the area, one of those was Perkūnkiemis (Lithuanian: Thunder's yard). Elektrėnai is one of the newest towns of Lithuania, having been established during the Soviet times in the early 1960s as the living space for workers of the nearby power plant and well expanded in the 1980s and early 1990s when it took a role of a place of living for builders and workers of nearby Kruonis Pumped Storage Plant. The name of the new town was derived from word "elektra" (English: electricity) – a borrowing to Lithuanian language from Greek. The alternatives for the naming of a locality like one of Gintarėnai (gintaras – Lithuanian word for amber) were rejected before the start of the construction. Most of the buildings in Elektrėnai are large block housing projects built during the Soviet times and there are no historical buildings. The town, however, is close to Elektrėnai Reservoir, an artificial lake that was created in order to cool down the Elektrėnai Power Plant. The water is several degrees warmer than water at the other nearby lakes.

Retail
There are several supermarkets (Norfa XXL, Maxima XX, Iki, Lidl, as well as a discounter (IKI Cento) in Elektrėnai.

Ice hockey
Elektrėnai is well known for its ice hockey tradition. For a rather long period of time Elektrėnai was the only city in Lithuania with a well-equipped skating rink. Two National Hockey League players: Darius Kasparaitis and Dainius Zubrus were born in Elektrėnai. Its local ice hockey team is Energija. Inhabitants of Elektrėnai make up a considerable part of the national ice hockey team.

Gallery

References

External links
 City of Elektrėnai - History
 Virtual Tour of Elektrėnai

 
Cities in Lithuania
Cities in Vilnius County
Cities and towns built in the Soviet Union
Municipalities administrative centres of Lithuania
Elektrėnai Municipality